Casa Duró  is a house located at  Avinguda Carlemany, 91, Escaldes-Engordany, Andorra. It is a heritage property registered in the Cultural Heritage of Andorra. It was built in 1953–4.

References

Escaldes-Engordany
Houses in Andorra
Houses completed in 1954
Cultural Heritage of Andorra